Castello Piccolomini (Italian for Piccolomini Castle)  is a  Middle Ages castle in Ortucchio, Province of L'Aquila (Abruzzo).

History

Architecture

References

External links

Piccolomini (Ortucchio)
Ortucchio